The Biyaygiri, also known as Bandjin, were an Aboriginal Australian people of northern Queensland.

Language
The language of the Biyaygiri was Biyay, a dialect of Warrgamay. The last speaker of the language was Nora Boyd, who enabled Robert Dixon to supplement what little was known of the dialect before dying at age 95.

Country
The Biyaygiri were the Indigenous people of Hinchinbrook Island, with a continental foothold on the area around Lucinda Point.

Social organisation
Some uncertainty exists as to whether the Biyay speakers on Hinchinbrook and the Lucinda Point were the same tribe. The latter called themselves Biaigin, and may have been tribally distinct. Those on Hinchinbrook had a four-class marriage system:
 Koorkeela
 Kookooroo
 Woongo
 Wooitcheroo

Biyaygiri furnished some of the major trade goods of the continental area adjacent to their island, and among those mainland tribes the Nautilus necklaces, and Melo shells they collected and worked came to be known by one of the Hinchinbrook tribal ethnonyms, bandjin.

History of contact
Hinchenbrook Island was first occupied by whites around 1863. The island was ethnically cleansed just under a decade later. Robert Dixon writes that an initial attempt to established a mission, where the Biyaygiri might have found some protection, was undertaken by the Reverend E. Fuller in 1870, but his sojourn in the area lasted only five months, during which the Biyaygiri kept their distance.
In retrospect, the Biyaygiri might have done well to seek his protection. In 1872, Sub-Inspector Robert Johnstone - who was convinced that there was only one real way to "teach the Aborigines a lesson" - led a party of police and troopers who beat a cordon across the island and cornered almost the whole tribe on a headland. Those who were not massacred on land were shot as they attempted to swim away.'

A slightly different version is provided by newspapers of the period. Fuller's mission was undertaken in 1874, two years later than Johnstone's cleansing of the area with the assistance of the Australian native police. The Biyaygiri had been decimated before Fuller's arrival and he spent 3 weeks trying to turn up Aboriginal people on the island without finding a single native person there.

Alternative names
 Bandji. (incorrect)
 Bandyin, Banjin
 Biaigiri
 Bijai. (language name)
 Bundjin
 Kunyin
 Uradig

Source:

Some words
 kooin. (white man)
 tonga. (father)
 wooyou. (tame dog)
 yappo. (mother)

Source:

Notes

Citations

Sources

Aboriginal peoples of Queensland
Far North Queensland